HMS Dublin was a 74-gun third rate ship of the line of the Royal Navy, launched on 13 February 1812 at Rotherhithe.

Dublin shared the proceeds of the capture on 17 July 1813 of Union with Abercrombie.

On 19 December 1812  recaptured the whaler . Rolla shared the salvage money for Frederick with Dublin and Inconstant.

In 1826 Dublin was reduced to a 40-gun ship. She became the flagship of Commander-in-Chief of the Pacific fleet Admiral Sir Graham Hamond, 2nd Baronet from 1835 to 1838, and Rear Admiral Richard Darton Thomas (1777–1857), from 1841 to 1845.

Dublin was sold out of the Navy in 1885.

Notes, citations and references
Notes

Citations

References

Lavery, Brian (2003) The Ship of the Line - Volume 1: The development of the battlefleet 1650-1850. Conway Maritime Press. .

External links
 

Ships of the line of the Royal Navy
Vengeur-class ships of the line
Ships built in Rotherhithe
1812 ships